Chill Factore is the UK's longest indoor ski slope; a £31M real snow centre located in the Trafford Park area of Trafford, Greater Manchester, United Kingdom.

In 2010, former Sales and marketing director of Alton Towers Morwenna Angove joined Chill Factore as CEO (Chief Executive Officer)

In 2011, the Guinness World Record for the longest chain of skiers to travel 100m without breaking, was recorded at Chill Factore.

In May 2011, Chill Factore hosted the UK's first Snowbombing event.

In 2018, Chill Factore rebranded as BEYOND, a new retail, experiential and leisure mix, which will bring additional restaurants and businesses to complement resident brands.

In March 2020, Chill Factore announced that its owners Extreme Cool Limited and U&I PLC had sold the company to Snow Centre who currently operate The Snow Centre in Hemel. They also announced that Morwenna Angove - CEO would be replaced by Ian Brown as managing director. Snow Centre took over at the end of March and have already spent £500,000 on renovations.

Slope facilities 

The main slope is served by two drag lifts, suspended from the ceiling thus widening the available piste area and allowing for easier maintenance of the slope. This differs from the other centres in the UK where the lift supports are on the piste. In addition to the main slope, the centre features a beginner slope, a luge track, and dedicated snowplay and tubing areas. Other activities include Airboarding, Snowscoot and Sledging.

Alpine Street 

The centre also includes a number of shops and restaurants in a themed 'Alpine Village' area.  On the upper level of the village is The Sports Bar, and The Lodge restaurant boasting slope side viewing balconies and conference/event facilities with a capacity of up to 250.

References

External links
 
 FaulknerBrowns Architects

Ski areas and resorts in England
Buildings and structures in Trafford
Indoor ski resorts